Roman Kresta (born 24 April 1976 in the Czech Republic), is a Czech professional rally driver. In 2005, he drove for Ford in the World Rally Championship. His co-driver was Jan Tománek. The pair won the Czech national rally championship in 2000, prior to their début in the WRC.
Kresta's first World Rally was the 2001 Acropolis Rally, driving a Ford Focus WRC. He has also driven for the works Skoda team, and as a privateer with Hyundai and Peugeot. His performances in his sole season with the works Ford World Rally Team in 2005 were not enough to prevent him from losing his seat to Mikko Hirvonen at the end of the season. However, he scored points in 11 of the 16 rallies held that season, achieving two fifth places in Corsica and Spain. He finished a career-best 8th overall in 2005 and scored 29 points, half the tally of teammate Toni Gardemeister's total of 58.

After the 2005 season, Kresta worked for Ford as a test driver.

Roman Kresta returned to Czech national rally championship and became champion in 2008 and 2009. Since season 2009 Kresta was racing with Peugeot 207 S2000.WRC 2010 saw Kresta's return to WRC. He participated with N4 Mitsubishi Lancer Evolution IX at Rally Sweden and Rally Finland. At Rally Sweden Kresta retired after 12 special stages because of problems with fuel tank. And Kresta finished 23rd at Rally Finland. He also raced in IRC 2010, round 9, Barum Rally Zlín 2010 with Škoda Fabia S2000. Kresta retired at SS5 because of crash, currently holding 5th position overally. He is going to race in last round of IRC 2010, 2010 Cyprus Rally. He finished 6th there, as best driver of not S2000 car. He also participated at Golden Stage Rally at Cyprus.

Results

Complete WRC results

IRC results

Czech Rally Championship results

Gallery

External links

Official Site (in Czech)
Profile at Rally Paradise 

1976 births
Living people
World Rally Championship drivers
European Rally Championship drivers
Czech rally drivers
Sportspeople from Zlín
Škoda Motorsport drivers